The Monroe County Public Library System is a public library system located in Monroe County, Florida, which includes the Florida Keys. The system has five branches located in Key Largo, Islamorada, Marathon, Big Pine, and Key West. The Monroe County Public Library system aims to "serve the educational, recreational and informational needs and interests" of the communities of the Florida Keys.

Services 
Each library is a full-service library that is open to residents and visitors and offers a variety of books, newspapers and articles, audio-visual resources, in-library online databases, and resources to Florida Keys history, including a large photo collection available online.

The libraries also provide public internet access computers, free Wi-Fi, and printing from public computers. In addition, they offer children's events, homework help, Ask A Librarian, various programs, and meeting rooms.

Branches 
 Key Largo Library
 Islamorada Library
 Marathon Library
 Big Pine Library
 Key West Library

External links 
 Monroe County Public Library
 Friends of the Library
 Monroe County Florida Library Advisory Board

References 

County library systems in Florida
Education in Monroe County, Florida
Buildings and structures in Monroe County, Florida
Public libraries in Florida